Myth of meritocracy is a phrase arguing that meritocracy, or achieving upward social mobility through one's own merits regardless of one's social position, is not widely attainable in capitalist societies because of inherent contradictions. Meritocracy is argued to be a myth because, despite being promoted as an open and accessible method of achieving upward class mobility under neoliberal or free market capitalism, wealth disparity and limited class mobility remain widespread, regardless of individual work ethic. Some scholars argue that the wealth disparity has even increased because the "myth" of meritocracy has been so effectively promoted and defended by the political and private elite through the media, education, corporate culture, and elsewhere. As described by economist Robert Reich, many Americans still believe in meritocracy despite "the nation drifting ever-farther away from it."

Inevitability 
It has been argued that meritocracy under capitalism will always remain a myth because, as Michael Kinsley states, "Inequalities of income, wealth, status are inevitable, and in a capitalist system even necessary." Even though many economists admit that too much disparity between the rich and the poor can destabilize society politically and economically, increases in wealth disparity under capitalism are expected to grow over time since, and French economist Thomas Piketty argues in his best-seller book that capitalism tends to reward the owners of capital with a greater and greater share of the economy's output, while wage-earners get a smaller and smaller share. Rising wealth disparity increasingly undermines faith in the existence of meritocracy, as beliefs in equal opportunity and social equality lose credibility among lower classes who recognize the preexisting reality of limited class mobility as a feature of the neoliberal version of capitalism. At the same time, the elite use their comparatively greater wealth, power, and influence to unequally benefit themselves and ensure their continued upper class status at the expense of lower classes, which further undermines beliefs in the existence of meritocracy.

Cornell University economist Robert H. Frank rejects meritocracy in his book Success and Luck: Good Fortune and the Myth of Meritocracy. He describes how chance plays a significant role in deciding who gets what that is not objectively based on merit. He does not discount the importance of hard work, but, using psychological studies, mathematical formulae, and examples, demonstrates that among groups of people performing at a high level, chance (luck) plays an enormous role in an individual's success.

Function 
The myth of meritocracy has been identified by scholars as a tool of the elite of a society to uphold and justify the reproduction of existing economic, social, and political hierarchies.

Class mobility 
The myth of meritocracy is used to maintain the belief that class mobility is widely attainable. As Daniel Markovits describes, "meritocracy excludes people outside of the elite, excludes middle class people and working class people from schooling, from good jobs, and from status and income, and then insults them by saying that the reason they’re excluded is that they don’t measure up, rather than that there’s a structural block to their inclusion." Furthermore, Markovits explicitly denounces the myth of the purported "American meritocracy", which for him "has become precisely what it was invented to combat: a mechanism for the dynastic transmission of wealth and privilege across generations." Phrases such as "pull yourself up by your bootstraps" have been identified as concealing the myth of meritocracy by placing the onus of upward class mobility solely on the individual while intentionally ignoring structural conditions. The minority of individuals who manage to overcome structural conditions and achieve upward class mobility are used as examples to support the idea that meritocracy exists.

In the United States, people of lower classes are conditioned to believe in meritocracy, despite class mobility in the country being among the lowest in industrialized economies. In the U.S., 50% of a father's income position is inherited by his son. In contrast, the amount in Norway or Canada is less than 20%. Moreover, in the U.S. 8% of children raised in the bottom 20% of the income distribution are able to climb to the top 20% as adults, while the figure in Denmark is nearly double at 15%. According to an academic study on why Americans overestimate class mobility, "research indicates that errors in social perception are driven by both informational factors—such as the lack of awareness of statistical information relevant to actual mobility trends—and motivational factors—the desire to believe that society is meritocratic." Americans are more inclined to believe in meritocracy out of the prospect that they will one day join the elite or upper class. Scholars have paralleled this belief to John Steinbeck's notable quote that "the poor see themselves not as an exploited proletariat but as temporarily embarrassed millionaires.” As academic Tad Delay states, "the fantasy of class mobility, of becoming bourgeois, is enough to defend the aristocracy."

In India, the myth of meritocracy has been identified as a mechanism for the elite to justify the structure of the caste system.

Racism 
The myth of meritocracy has been identified by scholars as promoting the color blind philosophy that anyone, regardless of their race or ethnicity, can succeed if they work hard enough. "This belief suggests that if a person of color is not succeeding at work (e.g. not getting promoted), it must be due to laziness or a lack of effort on that person's part," rather than a structural barrier, as described by professor, activist, and comedian Kevin Nadal, Katie Griffen, and Yinglee Wong. The concept of meritocracy has been suggested as a tool to both dismiss theoretical institutional racism and justify racist attitudes while also serving as an argument against affirmative action policies. The belief that the United States is a meritocracy is most accepted as an accurate reflection of reality among young, upper class, whites and Asians and least accepted as an accurate reflection of reality among older, working class, people of color.

Tyranny of merit
Harvard philosopher Michael Sandel in his latest book (2020) makes a case against meritocracy, calling it a "tyranny". Ongoing stalled social mobility and increasing inequality are laying bare the crass delusion of the American Dream, and the promise "you can make it if you want and try". The latter, according to Sandel, is the main culprit of the anger and frustration which brought some Western countries towards populism.

References

See also
 Just-world hypothesis
 Karma

Mythology
Social inequality
Socio-economic mobility